Bojanów may refer to:

Bojanów, Łódź Voivodeship (central Poland)
Bojanów, Silesian Voivodeship (south Poland)
Bojanów, Subcarpathian Voivodeship (south-east Poland)